LiveChat Software (WSE: LVC) is a customer service software company and developer of LiveChat  software as a service-based help desk software and online chat software for e-commerce sales, customer support, and lead generation.

The company has offices in Wrocław, Poland, and Boston, Massachusetts, United States. It serves more than 28,000 paid customers in over 150 countries, including Adobe, AirAsia, Best Buy, Better Business Bureau, ING, Huawei, Orange, and PayPal.

History 

Founded in 2002 as LiveChat Sp. z o.o. (LLC) in Wrocław, Poland, since October 2007 runs as a stock company.

In October 2006, 50% of company stock was bought by Capital Partners S.A., an investment and consultancy firm publicly listed at Warsaw Stock Exchange. In February 2008 Capital Partners S.A. decided to follow its strategy of having fewer companies but larger individual transactions and sold its entire stake along with another 13% of company stock to another publicly listed company, Gadu-Gadu S.A. This way LiveChat Software became another Polish company in Naspers capital group, joining Gadu-Gadu and Allegro. pl.

In January 2011, the management team sought to get back a controlling equity stake in the company and started a management buyout. After Naspers agreed in June 2011 to sell its entire stake, the founders teamed up with private equity firm Tar Heel Capital to finalize the buyout of the 60% stake. After the transaction was completed in September 2011, the founders own 60% of the stake, while Tar Heel Capital owns 40% of the company.

LiveChat Software has been introduced to the Warsaw Stock Exchange in April 2014 with the symbol LVC.

Products

LiveChat
LiveChat is the main product sold by the company. It is a live support software and help desk software used by companies to provide real-time communication with customers using different communication channels: online chat on the website and inside mobile applications, email, and social media (such as Facebook Messenger and Twitter).

LiveChat Software owns the technology it uses in the product, however, in areas unrelated directly to chat, the company relies on 3rd party services. Technology partners include Elastic for search and analytics engine, Postmark for delivery of transactional emails, Recurly for subscription billing, and Pingdom for performance monitoring and uptime tracking.

In the software market, the company cooperates with such companies as Microsoft, MySQL AB, Intel, and Red Hat.

ChatBot
ChatBot is the second product sold by the company. It was initially launched and developed as BotEngine and was rebranded to ChatBot in November 2018. It is an artificial intelligence-based bot platform. It creates intelligent chatbots to communicate with customers in messaging apps, such as Messenger and Slack. It integrates with LiveChat. Other features include rich messages, an intelligent matching system, an entity system (that allow to validate and save user input) , and an open API.

HelpDesk
HelpDesk is the third product sold by the company. It is a system for tracking, prioritizing, and resolving customer support tickets. Customers can leave messages for companies by using dedicated email addresses. Team members can create tickets if customer queries came from other communication channels, such as LiveChat, Facebook Messenger, WhatsApp, or a phone call.

All inquiries are collected as tickets and assigned the appropriate statuses and categories within the application. The application stores customer profiles and the history of their previous messages.

Knowledge Base
Knowledge Base is a tool that builds a self-service help center. It can be used both as an internal database for agents and an external public help center for customers. The internal widget is equipped with AI support that suggests articles to answer customer queries.

Past products
Products offered in the past, but currently discontinued are GG Pro (which was a corporate instant messenger) and Chat Server, which was a chat software for moderated chat rooms. Besides developing and selling communication solutions, from 20042010 LiveChat Software was the owner of one of the first Polish online chat portals  POLChat.

Another product offered by the company was chat.io. It was a chat widget for websites, apps, and social messaging with message sneak peeks, agent ratings, and chat routing. It allowed integrations with multiple communication channels, like Facebook Messenger. It was a chat platform for developers who like to customize products for their needs. The chat.io platform provided APIs to allow developers to build features atop the current offering. The product has been discontinued and became a part of LiveChat.

Awards 

In October 2007 LiveChat (formerly LIVECHAT Contact Center) was listed among thevtop Customer Support and Feedback applications in the Inside CRM report recommended by Guy Kawasaki.

In 2011 Deloitte listed LiveChat Software as one of the fastest-growing Central European technology companies in the pDeloitte Technology Fast 50 program  the company was selected for the 2011 award based on its 545% revenue growth over the previous five years (2005–2010). In 2012 the company was listed 18th in the same ranking, based on its 830% revenue growth.

In 2013 the company has been listed by Red Herring in the group of the most innovative companies from across Europe. It has been recognized by Deloitte in its annual Technology Fast 50 program and listed 18th with 624% revenue growth.

In 2015, during the Private Equity Forum & Awards Gala organized by the Executive Club with the support of the Polish Private Equity & Venture Capital Association, LiveChat Software has been awarded “Private Equity Diamonds in the category Portfolio company (small cap). Later that year, LiveChat Software was shortlisted for the European Small and Mid-Cap Awards organized by EuropeanIssuers, FESE, and the European Commission. One of three companies entered for the awards by Warsaw Stock Exchange, LiveChat was among the only CEE companies to be shortlisted.

Corporate social responsibility 
The company has supported organizations during the 2020 COVID-19 outbreak, by offering its services for free to non-profits and for-profits helping towards the Covid-19 cause.

It also has a long history of supporting the customer service community and individuals working in that space with tools that help with their development. One of the examples is Typing Speed Test  a free tool that works as an online speed typing contest. It is used to improve the efficiency and accuracy of typing skills (measured in words per minute). The number of tests taken with the tool already exceeds tens of millions. Another example is Customer Service Training  a free customer experience training for agents and customer service professionals.

See also

 Allegro.pl
 Gadu-Gadu
 LiveChat
 Naspers

References

Software companies established in 2002
Polish companies established in 2002
Internet properties established in 2002
Software companies of Poland
Information technology companies of Poland
Companies based in Wrocław
Polish brands